Edwardsia timida, also known as the timid burrowing anemone, is a species of sea anemone in the family Edwardsiidae.

Description
It has 16–32 tentacles arranged in 3 cycles, with 4 larger tentacles in the primary cycle. Its column is slender, without tubercles. It has cinclides (pores in the body wall for release of water and cnidocytes).

Range
Edwardsia timida is found in the Irish Sea and English Channel. It is one of 943 species listed by Natural England in 2014 as species of principal importance for the conservation of biodiversity in England.

Habitat
Edwardsia timida burrows in sand or gravel from lower shore to shallow sublittoral.

References

Edwardsia
Taxa named by Jean Louis Armand de Quatrefages de Bréau
Animals described in 1842
Anthozoa of Europe